Maurits is the Dutch equivalent of the masculine given name Maurice. People with the name include:

Royalty
 Prince Maurice of Nassau, (1567–1625), military leader of the Dutch Republic, son of William I of Orange
 Count John Maurice of Nassau, (1604–1679) also known as 'the Brazilian' 
 Prince Maurice of the Netherlands (1843–1850), second son of King William III
 Prince Maurits of Orange-Nassau, van Vollenhoven (born 1968)

Other people
 Maurits, pseudonym of Paulus Adrianus Daum (1850–1898), Dutch author
 Maurits Allessie (born 1945), Dutch physiologist
 Maurits de Baar (born 1997), Dutch footballer
 Maurits Basse (1868–1944), Belgian writer and teacher
 Maurits Binger (1868–1923), Dutch film director
 Maurits van den Boogert (born 1972, Dutch historian of the Ottoman Empire
 Maurits Caransa (1916–2009), Dutch real-estate developer and kidnapping victim
 Maurits Coppieters (1920–2005), Belgian politician
 Maurits Crucq (born 1968), Dutch field hockey player
 Maurits De Schrijver (born 1951), Belgian football player
 Maurits Dekker (1896–1962), Dutch novelist
 Maurits Cornelis Escher (1898–1972), Dutch graphic artist
 Maurits Gysseling (1919–1997), Belgian researcher
 Maurits Frederik Hendrik de Haas (1832–1895), Dutch-American marine painter
 Maurits Hansen (1794–1842), Norwegian writer
 Maurits Hendriks (born 1961), Dutch field hockey coach
 Maurits Jonkman (born 1986), Dutch cricket player
 Maurits Lammertink (born 1990), Dutch racing cyclist
  (1904–1985), Dutch zoologist
 Maurits Lindström (1932–2009), a Swedish geologist
 Maurits van Löben Sels (1876–1944), Dutch fencer
 Maurits Niekerk (1871–1940), Dutch impressionist painter
 Maurits van Nierop (1983–2008), Dutch cricket player
 Maurits Pasques de Chavonnes (1654–1724), Dutch Governor of the Cape Colony
 Maurits Post (1645–1677), Dutch architect
 Maurits van Rooijen (born 1956), Dutch social and economic historian 
 Maurits Sabbe (1873–1938), Belgian writer
 Maurits Schmitz (born 1993), Dutch football player
  (1840–1907), Dutch meteorologist and polar explorer

Other
 the Mauritshuis, a museum in The Hague, which was built by John Maurice of Nassau
 Staatsmijn Maurits, a state-owned coal mine in Geleen, Netherlands
 Mauritsstad, capital of Dutch Brazil and now a part Recife

See also
Maurice (disambiguation)
Mauritius (island)
Mauritz

Dutch masculine given names